Sulochana Latkar (born 30 July 1928 in Khadaklat, in the Chikodi Taluka of Belgaum district, Karnataka, India) is an Indian actress in Marathi and Hindi cinema. Mostly known by her screen name, Sulochana, she has starred in 50 Marathi films and approximately 250 Hindi films. She is best known for her performances in Marathi films such as Meeth Bhakar (1949), Vahinichya Bangdya (1953), and Dhakti Jaao (1958), as well as roles in Hindi films such as Dil Deke Dekho (1959). She and fellow actor Nirupa Roy epitomised the mother roles from 1959 until the early 1990s.

The Hindustan Times published an article in January 2019 talking about one of Sulochana's mother roles.

Hindi

Marathi

References

Indian filmographies
Actress filmographies